Oblivious is a 2001 short film written and directed by Ozgur Uyanik. It won the Canal+ Prize for Best European Short Film at the Brussels European Film Festival, 2001.

References

External links

2001 films
British short films
2001 short films
2000s English-language films